Christoph Grabenwarter (born 4 August 1966) is an Austrian legal scholar and professor, currently serving as the President of the Constitutional Court.

References 

Presidents of the Constitutional Court of Austria
Vice presidents of the Constitutional Court of Austria
Living people
1966 births